Edingham Castle is a late 16th-century tower house situated near Dalbeattie, Dumfries and Galloway. It is the remains of an early tower house built for the Livingstones of Little Airds. It is near Edingham Munitions Factory and is a scheduled ancient monument.

Edingham Castle was built as a four-story tower in 1570-1585 by the Morrisons. They were succeeded by the Afflecks in 1660. Later, in the 1700s this became the McVicar-Afflecks. It was roofless by 1872 when it was purchased by John Hutinson. The remains measure 8.6 meters x 7.2 meters.

See also
 Scheduled monuments in Dumfries and Galloway
 List of Category A listed buildings in Dumfries and Galloway

References

External links
 Edingham Castle at dalbeattiematters.co.uk

Castles in Dumfries and Galloway
Scheduled Ancient Monuments in Dumfries and Galloway
Tower houses in Scotland